Vargas is a locality in the municipality of Puente Viesgo, Cantabria. In 2008 its population was 1,339 people.

References

Populated places in Cantabria